Dor Malul (born April 30, 1989) is an Israeli professional footballer.

Career
Dor Malul is a rising player in Israeli football. Although he is a very technical player, over the years he has moved from the midfield to the defence. His great talent has acquired him a call up to the 2007 Meridian Cup alongside other young stars like Bojan Krkić, Marko Marin, Vurnon Anita.

In July 2011, he signed a 1-year loan contract with Beerschot AC.

Iמ summer 2013 Beershot dissolved and the player was a free agent. He began training at Beitar Jerusalem and impressed the team's players convinced the coach Eli Cohen to sign the player.

On 25 June 2014, he concluded two years for Hapoel Be'er Sheva.

External links
 Malul Profile

Honours

Hapoel Haifa
Israel State Cup (1): 2017–18

References

1989 births
Living people
Israeli Jews
Israeli footballers
Maccabi Tel Aviv F.C. players
Beerschot A.C. players
Beitar Jerusalem F.C. players
Hapoel Be'er Sheva F.C. players
Hapoel Haifa F.C. players
Israeli expatriate footballers
Expatriate footballers in Belgium
Israeli expatriate sportspeople in Belgium
Israeli Premier League players
Belgian Pro League players
Israeli people of Moroccan-Jewish descent
Footballers from Rishon LeZion
Association football midfielders
Association football defenders